The Midlothian Bulls were a basketball team, first based in Livingston, Scotland, later in Kirkliston to the west of Edinburgh. The team's history starts in 1989, following the withdrawal of the MIM Livingston team owned by businessman David Murray that competed in the British Basketball League. Both teams share a "crossover" history; the MIM team competed in the Scottish National League for two more years following their withdrawal from the BBL; the Bulls then continued in the success of their predecessor, winning numerous Scottish Cup and league titles. In 1997, the Bulls merged with the Dalkeith Saints to form the Midlothian Bulls, winning the league and cup once more. The team played their final game at the end of the 2000–01 season.

Notable players

 Iain MacLean

Record in European competition

See also
Livingston
Dalkeith Saints
Scottish Basketball Championship
Scottish Cup (basketball)

References

Defunct basketball teams in the United Kingdom
Sport in West Lothian
Defunct sports teams in Scotland
Basketball teams in Scotland
Sports teams in Edinburgh
Livingston, West Lothian
Basketball teams established in 1989
Basketball teams disestablished in 2001
1989 establishments in Scotland
2001 disestablishments in Scotland